There have been 59 police chiefs of the Minneapolis Police Department in the history of Minneapolis, Minnesota. The first was appointed in 1867, when the population of Minneapolis was about 5,000.

List of police chiefs

List of city marshals 
There were constables appointed as city marshals of St. Anthony before it was joined to Minneapolis.

References 
 

 
Minneapolis
 
Chief of Police